Eastrum is a village in Noardeast-Fryslân in the province of Friesland, the Netherlands. It had a population of around 188 in January 2017. Before 2019, the village was part of the Dongeradeel municipality.

History 
The village was first mentioned in 1449 as Aesterma, and means "eastern settlement". Eastrum is a terp (artificial living mound) village from the middle ages. The Dutch Reformed church dates from the 16th century, but has a 13th century tower.

Mellema State was a castle-like stins which probably dated from the 14th century. About 80% of the area around Eastrum was owned by the Mellemas. In 1735, it was demolished and reused to built Heemstra State in Oentsjerk.

In 1840, Eastrum was home to 295 people. In 2006, artefacts were discovered in the terp during an archaeological exploration dating from 3400 to 2850 BC.

Gallery

References

External links

 Site about Oostrum

Noardeast-Fryslân
Populated places in Friesland